Iraq competed at the 1980 Summer Olympics in Moscow, USSR. The Middle Eastern nation returned to the Olympic Games after missing the 1972 and 1976 Summer Olympics.

Results by event

Athletics
Men's 110 m Hurdles
 Abdul Jabbar Rahima
 Heat — 14.89 (→ did not advance)

Men's 4x400 metres Relay
 Hussain Ali Nasayif, Ali Hassan Kadhum, Fahim Abdul Al-Sada, and Abbas Murshid Al-Aibi
 Heat — 3:10.5 (→ did not advance)

Men's 400 m Hurdles
Ali Hassan Kadhum
 Heat — did not start (→ did not advance)

Men's Triple Jump
Mujhid Fahad Khalifa
 Qualification — 15.86 m (→ did not advance)

Boxing
Men's Light Flyweight (48 kg)
 Farid Salman Mahdi
 First Round — Bye
 Second Round — Lost to Hipolito Ramos (Cuba) on points (0-5) 

Men's Flyweight (51 kg)
 Samir Khiniab
 First Round — Lost to Hugh Russell (Ireland) on points (0-5)  

Men's Featherweight (57 kg)
 Abdulzhava Jawad Ali
 First Round — Lost to Ravsal Otgonbayar (Mongolia) on points (1-4)

Men's Light-Welterweight (63,5 kg)
 Farouk Jawad
 First Round — Defeated Peter Aydele (Nigeria) on points (5-0)
 Second Round — Defeated John Munduga (Uganda) after knock-out in first round
 Quarter Finals — Lost to José Aguilar (Cuba) after referee stopped contest in third round

Football (soccer)

Men's Team Competition
 Group Stage

 Quarter Finals

Team Roster
 Fatah Nsaief
 Kadhim Shibib
 Adnan Dirjal
 Hassan Farhan
 Wathiq Aswad
 Ibrahim Ali
 Alaa Ahmed
 Hadi Ahmed
 Abdullah Abdul-Wahid
 Jamal Ali
 Saad Jassim
 Falah Hassan
 Ali Kadhim
 Nazar Ashraf
 Thamir Yousif
 Hussein Saeed
 Adil Khdhayir

 Head Coach: Anwar Jassam

References
Official Olympic Reports

Nations at the 1980 Summer Olympics
1980
1980 in Iraqi sport